The Emma Petznick and Otto Schade House in Bowman, North Dakota, United States, is a Prairie School house built in 1919.  It was listed on the National Register of Historic Places in 2008.  It has also been known as the Opal Burns Home, as the H.A. Blocker House, and as the G.A. Tembreull House.

It was the longtime home of Opal Anderson Burns (died 2012), granddaughter of Otto and Emma.

By 1908 or 1909, the Otto Schade family had four children and lived in a sod house, in front of which they were photographed.

References

External links
Flickr photo of house

Houses in Bowman County, North Dakota
Houses completed in 1919
Houses on the National Register of Historic Places in North Dakota
Prairie School architecture in North Dakota
National Register of Historic Places in Bowman County, North Dakota
1919 establishments in North Dakota